Nicolò Cherubin (born 2 December 1986) is an Italian football coach and former player, who played as a defender. He is the current assistant coach of Serie D club Luparense.

Playing career

Early career

Bologna
Cherubin joined Bologna in July 2010 for €1.5 million fee. Cherubin spent two seasons on loan at Atalanta B.C. from 2014 to 2016. He returned to Bologna on 1 July 2016, receiving a call-up from the coach. However, he only appeared as an unused substitute in that match.

Verona
On 31 August 2016, Cherubin joined Verona on a season-long loan deal, with an obligation to make the deal permanent. As part of the deal, Filip Helander moved to Bologna.

On 12 June 2017, Cherubin joined Verona on a definitive basis.

Padova
On 9 January 2019, Cherubin joined Padova.

Coaching career
On 11 June 2022, Cherubin was formally appointed as the new assistant coach of Serie D club Luparense, after having served as a player and then as a technical collaborator for previous head coach Nicola Zanini during the 2021–22 season.

On 19 December 2022, Cherubin was promoted as head coach of Luparense, replacing Mauro Zironelli in charge of the first team, but was then moved back to his assistant job eight days later as Zironelli was reappointed in charge.

References

External links
Calciatori profile 

Living people
1986 births
Sportspeople from Vicenza
Italian footballers
Footballers from Veneto
Association football defenders
Serie A players
Serie B players
Serie C players
Serie D players
A.S. Cittadella players
U.S. Avellino 1912 players
Reggina 1914 players
Bologna F.C. 1909 players
Atalanta B.C. players
Hellas Verona F.C. players
Ascoli Calcio 1898 F.C. players
Calcio Padova players
S.S. Arezzo players
Italian football managers
Serie D managers